Corey John Richards (born 25 August 1975 in Camden, New South Wales) is a former Australian first-class cricketer and current Sydney First Grade cricketer for the Bankstown Bulldogs.

Career 
In 1995–96 Richards made his first-class debut for New South Wales and was relied upon as a solid top-order batsman when he won the NSW Player of the Year award in 1998–99. A poor season in 2002–03 saw him dropped from the state side.

In the 2005–06 season, the 30-year-old Richards received a surprise call up to the New South Wales squad and returned in both ING Cup and Pura Cup matches. His performances were average at best, with a top score of 62 in the ING Cup competition so far.

Richards made his List A debut in the 1996–97 English season and made his last appearance in 2006 for the Scotland.

See also
 List of New South Wales representative cricketers

External links 
 CricInfo.com
 Bankstown District Cricket Club

1975 births
Living people
New South Wales cricketers
Scotland cricketers
Australian cricketers
Cricketers from Sydney